Te Tai Tonga is a New Zealand parliamentary Māori electorate, returning one Member of Parliament to the New Zealand House of Representatives. It was established for the 1996 general election, replacing Southern Maori. The current MP for Te Tai Tonga is Rino Tirikatene of the Labour Party.

Population centres

Te Tai Tonga is geographically by far the largest of the seventy-one electorates of New Zealand, covering all of the South Island, Stewart Island, the Chatham Islands, all the islands in the Southern Ocean and a large part of the Wellington urban area, namely Wellington City as far as Churton Park, and Lower Hutt City south of Naenae and west of Wainuiomata. Besides Wellington, the main centres in Te Tai Tonga are Nelson, Christchurch, Timaru, Oamaru, Dunedin, Queenstown, and Invercargill.

As a Māori electorate, Te Tai Tonga overlaps with the sixteen South Island electorates, as well as Rongotai and Wellington Central, and parts of Ōhāriu and Hutt South.

Te Tai Tonga's size was marginally decreased after a review of boundaries in 2007, when the suburbs of Naenae and Taitā were moved into Ikaroa-Rāwhiti. The 2013/14 redistribution did not further alter the boundaries of the electorate. The 2019/20 redistribution adjusted the north-east boundary to align with the northern boundary of Hutt South.

The main iwi of Te Tai Tonga are Ngāi Tahu/Kāi Tahu, Kāti Māmoe and Waitaha, and in the North Island, Te Āti Awa ki Whakarongotai, Ngāti Toa Rangatira and Ngāti Poneke, that latter of which is not iwi in the traditional sense, but an urban pan-tribal grouping. The Chatham Islands was invaded by members of Ngāti Mutunga and Ngāti Tama, and their descendants live there today, alongside the indigenous Moriori.

History

Te Tai Tonga was established for the 1996 general election, replacing Southern Maori which had existed since the first Māori elections in 1868. The 1996 election was the first to use the Mixed Member Proportional (MMP) voting system and a new formula for calculating the number of electorates, which resulted in an increase in the number of Māori electorates from four to five.

The main difference involves the separation of the Wairarapa and Hawke's Bay into seats wholly located in the North Island—initially Te Puku O Te Whenua, and since 1999 Ikaroa-Rāwhiti.

Whetū Tirikatene-Sullivan had served as Southern Maori's representative in Parliament since 1967—during the terms of five different governments and nine Prime Ministers. However, the New Zealand First Party challenger Tū Wyllie tipped her out of the seat in 1996, as sixty years of Labour Party control of the Māori electorates ended.

In 1999 New Zealand First lost its electoral footing after an unpopular term in office, firstly as junior government-coalition partner and then following an internal split in the party, with much of the party's original parliamentary caucus leaving the party ("waka-jumping") to prop up the government of Jenny Shipley (although Wyllie himself did not join the breakaway group). Along with a drop in the New Zealand First vote from thirteen to four percent nationwide came the return of the Māori electorates to Labour and the election of Mahara Okeroa to Parliament as the Labour Party MP for Te Tai Tonga.

A political difference of opinion between many Māori and the Labour Party emerged in 2004, when Helen Clark's Labour government introduced the Seabed and Foreshore Bill, claiming the coastline for the Crown and in the process providing the catalyst for the launch of the Māori Party (7 July 2004), which went on to win four of the seven Māori seats (but not the plurality of the party votes cast in those seats) at the 2005 general election. Te Tai Tonga did not form part of this electoral sea-change, with Okeroa's majority slashed from 8,000 to around 2,500 despite his facing two fewer contenders than in 2002.

He was returned in the 2014 and 2017 elections with increased majorities.

Members of Parliament
Key

List MPs
Members of Parliament elected from party lists in elections where that person also unsuccessfully contested the Te Tai Tonga electorate. Unless otherwise stated, all MPs terms began and ended at general elections.

Election results

2020 election

2017 election

2014 election

2011 election

Electorate (as at 26 November 2011): 31,933

2008 election

2005 election

1999 election
Refer to Candidates in the New Zealand general election 1999 by electorate#Te Tai Tonga for a list of candidates.

1996 election

Notes

References

External links
Electorate Profile  Parliamentary Library

Māori electorates
1996 establishments in New Zealand